Oyarzabal is a surname. Notable people with the surname include:

 Gloria Oyarzabal (born 1971), Spanish visual artist and teacher
 Mikel Oyarzabal (born 1997), Spanish footballer
 Antonio de Oyarzabal (born 1935), Spanish diplomat and politician